Jedličkův ústav ("Jedlička’s Institute for Disabled") is a Czech medical and educational institute specialized in the care of disabled children and adults. The primary location of the institute is situated in the Prague district of  Vyšehrad. It was founded in 1913 by surgeon Rudolf Jedlička, and it is the oldest facility of its kind in the Czech Republic. The institute includes a nursery, primary school and several types of secondary schools.

History 
Jedlička's Institute was founded on 1 April 1913, by the Spolek pro léčbu a výchovu rachitiků a mrzáků v Praze ("Association for Treatment and Education of Rachitics and Cripples") in Prague. Rudolf Jedlička, the chairman of the association, intended to improve the education of disabled people and integrate them to normal life, according to his own words "to turn beggars into taxpayers".

The first director of the institute was teacher and choirmaster František Bakule. At the beginning of World War I, the institute became a part of the program focused on the treatment, rehabilitation and integration of soldiers injured in the war.

In the 1920s, under the director Augustin Bartoš, the capacity of the institute was increased by building a new school. After 1945 and the subsequent communist takeover in 1948, the institute was transferred into the hands of the state. At the same time, it was merged with a similar institute in Liberec.

The founder of the institution, Rudolf Jedlička, donated to the school his own villa in Harrachov (resort in the Giant Mountains). In the 1950s, the villa went into the hands of the state and was rebuilt into a government holiday resort.

References

External links 
Jedličkův ústav a školy  – official pages

Disability organizations based in the Czech Republic
Prague 4
Buildings and structures in Prague